I've Got the Rock & Rolls Again is the second studio album by The Joe Perry Project. It charted at No. 100 in the Billboard 200 albums chart. The songs "Listen to the Rock" and "East Coast, West Coast" were written by Charlie Farren and were local hits for his previous band, Balloon.

Track listing
Side one
"East Coast, West Coast" (Charlie Farren) – 3:06 
"No Substitute for Arrogance" (Joe Perry, Farren) – 3:25 
"I've Got the Rock 'n' Rolls Again" (Perry, Farren) – 4:34 
"Buzz Buzz" (David Hull, Andrew Resnick, Charlie Karp) – 3:41 
"Soldier of Fortune" (Perry)  – 3:05 

Side two
"TV Police" (Perry, Farren) – 4:11 
"Listen to the Rock" (Farren) – 3:20 
"Dirty Little Things" (Hull) – 3:42 
"Play the Game" (Perry, Farren) – 5:20
"South Station Blues" (Perry) – 4:10

Personnel
Band members
Joe Perry – guitars, backing vocals, lead vocals on tracks 5 and 10
Charlie Farren – rhythm guitar, lead vocals
David Hull – bass, backing vocals, lead vocals on tracks 4 and 8
Ronnie Stewart – drums, percussion

Production
Bruce Botnick – producer
Rik Pekkonen – engineer, mixing at Oceanway Studios, Los Angeles
Jack Crymes, James Sandweiss, Jim Pace – engineers
David Bianco, Jim Scott – assistant engineers
Bernie Grundman – mastering at A&M Studios, Los Angeles
John Berg – album design

References

1981 albums
The Joe Perry Project albums
Albums produced by Bruce Botnick
Columbia Records albums